Earth At Night In Color is an American nature documentary television series created by Offspring Films and narrated by Tom Hiddleston. The series premiered on December 4, 2020 on Apple TV+, with a second season premiering on April 16, 2021.

Premise 
Using specialized low-light cameras, Earth At Night In Color reveals the nocturnal behaviors of animals across six different continents around the world.

Episodes

Series overview

Season 1 (2020)

Season 2 (2021)

Production 
Earth At Night In Color was announced on August 26, 2020, along with the rest of the late-2020 docuseries lineup being released by Apple TV+, including Long Way Up, Tiny World, and Becoming You. The six-episode first season was released on December 4, 2020, and the second six-episode season was released on April 16, 2021.

References

External links 
  – official site
 

2020s American documentary television series
English-language television shows
2020 American television series debuts
2021 American television series endings
Apple TV+ original programming
Documentaries about animals